Nam Man is a village and tambon (sub-district) of Tha Pla district, in Uttaradit province, Thailand. In 2005 it had a population of 7,270 people. The tambon contains 12 villages.

References

Tambon of Uttaradit province
Populated places in Uttaradit province